The 1995 Taiwanese legislative election were held on 2 December 1995. The result was a victory for the Kuomintang, which won 85 of the 164 seats. Voter turnout was 67.6%.

Results

References

Taiwan
1995 elections in Taiwan
Legislative elections in Taiwan